The Canton of Archiac is a former canton of the Charente-Maritime département, in France. It was disbanded following the French canton reorganisation which came into effect in March 2015. It consisted of 17 communes, which joined the canton of Jonzac in 2015. It had 6,813 inhabitants (2012). The lowest point was 8 m in the commune of Celles, the highest point was in Saint-Eugène at 121 m, the average elevation was 66 m. The least populated commune was Neulles with 139 and the most populated commune was Archiac with 864.

Communes
The canton comprised the following communes:

Allas-Champagne
Archiac
Arthenac
Brie-sous-Archiac
Celles
Cierzac
Germignac
Jarnac-Champagne
Lonzac
Neuillac
Neulles
Saint-Ciers-Champagne
Saint-Eugène
Saint-Germain-de-Vibrac
Sainte-Lheurine
Saint-Maigrin
Saint-Martial-sur-Né

Population history

See also 
 Cantons of the Charente-Maritime department

References

 
Archiac
2015 disestablishments in France
States and territories disestablished in 2015